= Striomecyna =

Scientific classification
- Kingdom: Animalia
- Phylum: Arthropoda
- Class: Insecta
- Order: Coleoptera
- Suborder: Polyphaga
- Infraorder: Cucujiformia
- Family: Cerambycidae
- Genus: Striomecyna
- Species: S. bimaculicollis

Binomial name
- Striomecyna bimaculicollis Breuning, 1957

Genus of beetles

Striomecyna bimaculicollis is a species of beetle in the family Cerambycidae, and the only species in the genus Striomecyna. It was described by Breuning in 1957.
